Andrea Justine Landi (born March 2, 1988) is an American female volleyball player.

With her club Iowa Ice she competed at the 2013 FIVB Volleyball Women's Club World Championship.

References

External links
 profile at FIVB.org

1988 births
Living people
Sportspeople from Coral Springs, Florida
American women's volleyball players
21st-century American women
Louisville Cardinals women's volleyball players